"The Misfortune Cookie" is the third segment of the fourteenth episode from the first season (1985–86) of the television series The Twilight Zone. In this segment, a restaurant critic discovers a Chinese restaurant where the fortune cookies have fortunes which come true.

Plot
Harry Folger is a food critic for a major newspaper. Restaurants live or die by his reviews, which often use gratuitously nasty prose in order to draw more readers. Spiting journalistic integrity, Harry usually only visits the restaurants he pans so that he can collect their matchbooks and display them as tombstones in a graveyard scene at his office.

Harry visits a new Chinese restaurant called "Mr. Lee's Chinese Cuisine", orders a massive amount of food and then immediately asks for the check without eating. Assuming Harry was displeased with the food, the owner Mr. Lee apologizes, tells Harry the meal is free, and presents him with a fortune cookie. The fortune reads "A grand reward awaits you just around the corner."

As Harry walks past an alley, a thief knocks him down and drops $100,000 in diamonds before running away. The grateful jewelry store owner gives Harry $1,000 as a reward. Realizing the fortune cookies are magical, Harry returns for more. When Mr. Lee complains that customers canceled their reservations because of his review, Harry promises to write a more favorable re-review if he is allowed to have a table. After again not touching his food, he receives a fortune that says "April arrives today, bringing romance." As it is September, Harry storms out, intending to go back on his promise. On the way to his office, he meets a woman asking for directions. He shows her the way and asks her out to dinner. She introduces herself as April Hamilton.

Harry takes her out to Mr. Lee's. Harry, again, does not eat any food despite April telling him how good it is. As the two get fortune cookies, April's fortune says that she will soon recognize a grievous error in judgment, while Harry's fortune says "You're going to die." Outraged, Harry threatens Mr. Lee and causes a scene. Disconcerted, April leaves. As he exits the restaurant, Harry is overcome with massive hunger pangs. He finds that he is on a street of Chinese restaurants that were not there before. He wanders into one restaurant and is served dozens of plates of food, but is unable to satisfy his hunger. As he continues to endlessly eat, he receives a fortune cookie that says "You're dead.", and realizes he is now experiencing his own personal hell: being served endless plates of Chinese food which will never satisfy his eternal hunger.

As the episode closes, Harry's graveyard scene is shown. A tombstone with Harry's name on it has been added.

Closing narration
"Check please, for Mr. Harry Folger. For whom the phrase "dim sum" is not merely a description, but a damnation. A man who finds himself sitting down to a single, never-ending course of just desserts, prepared for him in the kitchens...of The Twilight Zone."

External links
 

The Twilight Zone (1985 TV series season 1) episodes
1986 American television episodes
Television shows based on short fiction

fr:Dessert explosif